Graves Registration can refer to:

 The Graves Registration Service, a group within the United States Department of Defense Quartermaster Corps. 
 The Graves Registration Commission, a British Commonwealth commission.